Periodic elections for the Tasmanian Legislative Council were held on 5 May 2012. The two seats up for election were Hobart, held by retiring Labor MLC Doug Parkinson, and Western Tiers, held by independent MLC Greg Hall. These seats were last contested (under different names) in 2006.

Hobart
The seat of Hobart, formerly known as Wellington, had been held by Doug Parkinson for the Labor Party since 1994; his retirement left Derwent MLC Craig Farrell as the only remaining Labor MLC. As his replacement Labor preselected Dean Winter, a party researcher and staffer for federal MP Julie Collins. His main competition was Rob Valentine, Lord Mayor of Hobart from 1999 to 2011, who was running as an independent candidate. Secondary school teacher Penelope Ann was selected by the Greens, while other independent candidates included engineering consultant James Sugden, former Liberal preselection candidate Paul Hiscutt (who contested Wellington in 2006, and whose father Hugh was an MLC from 1983 to 1995) and serial candidate John Forster.

Western Tiers
The seat of Western Tiers, renamed from Rowallan in 2006, had been held since 2001 by independent Greg Hall. His only opponent for re-election was another independent candidate, John Hawkins, an antiques dealer and environmental campaigner.

References

2012 elections in Australia
Elections in Tasmania
2010s in Tasmania
May 2012 events in Australia